The Mesa Redonda fire occurred on Saturday, 29 December 2001 in Lima, Peru. The disaster killed at least 291 people and injured at least another 134. It is currently the worst firework-related fire in history in terms of deaths.

Origin 

In 2001, the Mesa Redonda shopping center, located in Central Lima, consisted largely of wood and adobe houses lining narrow streets. In December, fireworks merchants were known to sell their goods for holiday celebrations. Wary of the danger, the municipal government of Lima declared the area an "emergency zone."

The fire began at about 7:30 PM on the night of 29 December when a fireworks display created a chain reaction, setting off the fireworks of other nearby vendors. A spark from the demonstration had landed on a stockpile of fireworks, creating the initial explosion. The aftermath created a "wall of fire" that spread for four blocks and raged for several hours.

See also
Utopía nightclub fire
Las Malvinas fire

References

2001 fires in South America
2001 in Peru
December 2001 events in South America
Fireworks accidents and incidents
Fires in Peru